Crashbox is an educational children's television series co-created by Eamon Harrington and John Watkin for HBO Family that ran from 1999 to 2000 in the United States.  It was HBO's second attempt (their first being Braingames 15 years earlier) at a show focused on educational skits.

Crashbox was one of the original programs for the relaunch of the HBO Family channel in February 1999. Although it has never been released on physical media like DVD or VHS, it is still rerun on HBO Family and is found on various streaming services.

Production
Crashbox was created by Planet Grande Pictures (consisting of Eamon Harrington and John Watkin) and is animated by Cuppa Coffee Studios, headed by Adam Shaheen. Planet Grande Pictures engaged Cuppa Coffee Studios 8 months to complete 13 hours of programming.

Premise
The show takes place in the insides of a game computer where green game cartridges (which are sculpted out of clay) are created and loaded by rusty tin robots, occasionally with short sketches of them "repairing" damaged games. The format of each episode is The Electric Company-esque, with sketches not connecting to each other nor following a sequential plot. Each half-hour episode consists of seven 2-to-5-minute educational games, and occasionally an eighth bonus game, covering subjects like history, math, spelling, and nature.

Segments
The following are the games of the show listed in alphabetical order:

 Captain Bones - A pirate skeleton named Captain Bones has the viewers solve math problems and other types of puzzles by having his bones form the numbers or objects and having the viewers move a limited number of his bones to pull it off. Throughout the game, Captain Bones will openly mock and demean the viewers using several pirate-esque insults, eventually becoming so irate that he demands them to leave his sight, moving on to another game.
 Dirty Pictures - In an art museum that is closed for cleaning, a maid dusts off a picture with the elderly security guard holding up cards that give the hints of the person in the picture. This is a non-speaking segment.
 Distraction News - A cardboard cutout newswoman named Dora Smarmy provides informative news segments while distractive images appear during the broadcast. The object is to see how well the viewers were able to remember key facts from the broadcast without being distracted.
 Ear We Are* - A nervous, stubborn and grumpy left ear and his twin brother, who is a brash, goofy and oblivious right one, describe sounds for the viewers to guess what event or thing they refer to. The segment only appears in Episodes #1-25.
 Eddie Bull - Eddie Bull gives viewers three hints at what animal at the Walla Walla Washington Zoo ate him. Once the animal is identified, Eddie is regurgitated and the game then ends.
 Haunted House Party - A haunted house party hosted by the unseen Horrid One has ghosts attend as the viewer must identify the mystery guest of honor by listening to clues about them. When all the clues have been said, the Horrid One recaps them to the viewers before the historical figure is revealed in cardboard cutout form after a bright flash of lightning. In Episodes #40-52, the narrator does not speak until the gargoyles open the gate, and when the "mysterious mystery guest" is finally shown, the mouth movement is different from Episodes #1-37.
 Lens McCracken* - An noir-styled detective named Lens McCracken develops zoomed-in and blurry pictures from a case he's working on, that viewers must solve by figuring out what the full image would be. The photos are then also be solved by his dark room's computer called the Solutionator one by one, and detective ends the segment by piecing together a story from the solved photos. The segment only appears in Episodes #4-38.
 Mug Shots - Detective Verity has the viewers look at the interrogated testimony from the photographed suspects of a crime where they must find out who is telling the truth and which of the other three are lying as they each state where they were when the crime was happening. The viewer solves the puzzle by spotting the contradictions or factual inaccuracies in the testimonies. Each of the suspects are shown in live action, but dubbed over by a different actor. When the innocent one is identified, the game ends.
 Paige and Sage* - An unseen valley girl talks through the pictures of identical Barbie doll twins Paige and Sage, where viewers must spot the differences in the pictures. The segment only appears in Episodes #3-19. 
 Poop or Scoop - The game's announcer gives facts about animals where they must guess if they are true or false.
 Psycho Math - A robot named Professor Rocket gives the viewers long math problems for them to solve with countable pictures or descriptions of numbered things, such as the number of members on a baseball team qualifying for the number "9".
 Radio Scramble - An anthropomorphic microphone named DJ Jumping Johnny Jumble has the viewers unscramble a word that is the title of the song that he plays at the KBOX radio station. He will sometimes also deliver traffic, commercials, sports, or weather reports that also are anagram puzzles.
 Revolting Slob - A puppet sketch where a polite female voice uses the messy Revolting Slob to describe three three-choice answer vocabulary questions. The sketch ends with another word of the final question having the Revolting Slob explode with the female narrator stating that "No slobs were harmed in the making of this show." In Episodes #2-39, the revolting slob is grumpy and gluttonous, and the scenery takes place in his living room. But in Episodes #40-52, the revolting slob is silly and exuberant, and the scenery takes place in his kitchen. He always does a revolting action in each segment.  
 Riddle Snake - An unseen raj reads the riddles from a pungi-playing snake that the viewers must solve.
 Sketch Pad - A beatnik named Sketch Pad draws pictures of some things happening in a riddle-like scenario, as the viewers must solve the reason why these specific things are happening. The goal of the game is to try to guess the event or outcome that Sketch Pad did not mention.
 Ten Seconds - A supercomputer gives the viewers ten seconds to solve each of four in Episodes #1-39 or five in Episodes #40-51 rebus puzzles and guess the answer. At the end of the game, the announcer signs off, moving to another game.
 Think Tank - Inside a fish tank, a Jamaican submarine captain named Captain Bob has the viewers figure out a word that explains what each of three things that appear have in common.  
 Word Shake* - An artificially intelligent American-French chef in a black-and-white movie machine named Chef Word Shake demonstrates two or three letters, words or phrases that are to be used by the viewers to combine into one word or phrase, such as the letters "D" and "K" to form "decay" and the words "disturb" and "honey" to make "the Easter Bunny". The sketch usually ends with the kitchen exploding with flour. The segment only appears in Episodes #2-25.

Near the end of each episode, the robots recap and review most of the games to the viewers in a "Crashbox Rewind". Segments marked with an asterisk (*) don't appear in Seasons 1B and 2.

Cast

Episodes

Reception
The series received generally positive reviews from audiences and parents on Common Sense Media, with a 4 out of 5 star rating.

References

External links
 Crashbox and Cuppa Coffee article in TAKE ONE
 

HBO original programming
1999 American television series debuts
2000 American television series endings
1990s American animated television series
2000s American animated television series
1999 Canadian television series debuts
2000 Canadian television series endings
1990s Canadian animated television series
2000s Canadian animated television series
American children's animated game shows
American children's animated science fiction television series
American children's animated education television series
American stop-motion animated television series
American television series with live action and animation
American children's education television series
American television shows featuring puppetry
Canadian children's animated game shows
Canadian children's animated science fiction television series
Canadian children's animated education television series
Canadian stop-motion animated television series
Canadian television series with live action and animation
Canadian children's education television series
Canadian television shows featuring puppetry
English-language television shows
Science education television series
Animated television series about robots
Animated television series about animals
Animated television series about monkeys
Television series about pirates
Television series about radio
Works set in computers
Television series by Cuppa Coffee Studios
Television series by Home Box Office
Television series by Warner Bros. Television Studios
Television shows filmed in Toronto
Television shows filmed in California